Zachary Browne (born March 28, 1985) is an American former television and film actor.

Browne has had guest roles on ER, 7th Heaven and Dr. Quinn, Medicine Woman, among other shows. He was also on 7th Heaven as Stan in 1997, and Kyle(young) on The Pretender. He auditioned for the role of Marty Preston in Shiloh (1996) and the director was very impressed with him. He did not get the part because he was too young. However, by the time Shiloh 2 was being cast he was 13 years old and was remembered when he auditioned. Shiloh 2: Shiloh Season (1999) was Zachary's final film, as he ceased acting at the age of 14.

Filmography

Film

Television

Awards and nominations

External links

1985 births
Living people
American male child actors
American male film actors
American male television actors
Male actors from Sacramento, California